Gag is a device designed to prevent speech.

Gag or the acronym GAG may also refer to:

Humor
Gag cartoon, a one-panel comic that is usually intended to have ridiculous happenings
Yonkoma, a four panel form of Japanese gag comic strip
Gag gift, an informal term for a practical joke device
Visual gag, a comedian's term for a joke, a comedic sketch or routine, or the visible effect of a magical illusion
Running gag, a literary device that repeats in a certain work of literature

Legal
Gag order, a writ or court order taken out with an intent to prevent information or comment from being made public
Gag rule, a part of court proceedings and congressional proceedings

Physical objects
Gag (BDSM), used in BDSM activities
Gag bit, a type of bit used for strong horses
Gag (medical device), a device used by dentists, surgeons and veterinarians to hold the patient's mouth open
Jennings gag, a form of medical gag
Whitehead gag, a form of medical gag
Hallam gag, a form of medical gag
Wind gag, a woolly windscreen put round a microphone to stop it from picking up wind noise

Biology
Gag reflex, the feeling of choking or accompanying involuntary muscular contractions in the throat
Glycosaminoglycan (GAG), a polysaccharide that is part of connective tissue
Group-specific antigen, the genetic material that codes for the core structural proteins of a retrovirus
Gag grouper, a species of fish
 GAG, one of two codons for glutamic acid

People
Anton Gag (1859–1908), painter
Andrei Gag (born 1991), Romanian athlete
Wanda Gág (1893–1946), children's book writer and illustrator

Other uses
gag, the ISO 639 code for the Gagauz language
Gag Island, one of the Raja Ampat Islands in Indonesia
Gag (album), a 1984 album by Fad Gadget
Gagged (EP), a 2015 EP by Violet Chachki
The Go-Ahead Group, a British transport company
Gorniczy Agregat Gasniczy (GAG), a jet engine unit used in mine fires
Grenfell Action Group, a residents' association at Grenfell Tower, London which caught fire
Gustav Adolf Grammar School, a school in Estonia